The European Trade Union Confederation (ETUC) is the major trade union organisation representing workers at the European level. In its role as a European social partner, the ETUC works both in a consulting role with the European Commission and negotiates agreements and work programmes with European employers. It coordinates the national and sectoral policies of its affiliates on social and economic matters, particularly in the framework of the EU institutional processes, including European economic governance and the EU Semester.

History
The ETUC was established in 1973, to coordinate and represent workers and their trade unions at the European level, and has grown as more countries have joined the EU.

Representativeness and constitution
At present, the ETUC represents almost 45 million workers across Europe, belonging to 89 national trade union confederations from 39 European countries, and 10 European Industry Federations. It includes both a Women's Committee and a Youth Committee, which represent the interests of these two groups within its membership respectively.

In cooperation with the European Trade Union Institute, the ETUC has set up UnionMigrantNet, a network of trade union contact points within the member states, with the aim of assisting migrants and their families. The ETUC coordinates the activities of the 45 Interregional Trade Union Councils (IRTUCs), which organise trade union cooperation across national borders in the EU and defend the right to free movement of workers.

Other trade union structures operating under the auspices of the ETUC are Eurocadres (Council of European Professional and Managerial Staff) and the European Federation of Retired and Older People (FERPA).

Currently, the General Secretary of the organisation is Esther Lynch, who was elected in December 2022. The President is Laurent Berger, from the CFDT in France. The Deputy General Secretary is Claes-Mikael Stahl, and the Confederal Secretaries are Liina Carr, Isabelle Schömann, and Ludovic Voet. 

The ETUC's delegate congress, which takes place every four years, approves and amends the constitution and elects its leadership team. All policies and activities are agreed by affiliates' representatives, who maintain their own independence. The 14th congress took place in Vienna in May 2019.

Mission and activities
The ETUC's mission is to encourage European unity, peace and stability, enabling working people and their families to enjoy full human, civil, social and employment rights and high living standards. To achieve this, it promotes the European social model, combining sustainable economic growth with ever-improving living and working conditions, including full employment, well-functioning social dialogue and industrial relations, social protection, equal opportunities, good quality jobs, social inclusion, and open and democratic policy-making process that involves citizens fully in the decisions that affect them.
At the 2015 Paris Congress, the ETUC agreed on a Manifesto and an Action Programme for four years until 2019. These documents focus on three objectives:

 A strong economy that serves the people
 Stronger unions for democratic values and democracy at work
 A core of ambitious social standards

A strong economy

The ETUC works with all the EU governing bodies: Presidency, Council, Commission and Parliament. Its right to represent the interests of European workers in the formulation of EU macroeconomic and employment policy is articulated in the EU Treaty. It takes part in bi-annual Tripartite Social Summits; responds to European Commission proposals; liaises with a cross-party Intergroup of MEPs in the European Parliament; and coordinates trade union participation in a number of advisory bodies, including the tripartite EU agencies for vocational training (CEDEFOP), improvement of living and working conditions (Eurofound), and health and safety (EU-OSHA). It works closely with the Workers' Group in the Economic and Social Committee.

At the meetings of the Macroeconomic Dialogue (MED), established in 1998, the social partners discuss economic policy with the EU Economic and Financial Affairs Council (ECOFIN), the European Central Bank (ECB), and the commission. The ETUC wants greater trade union participation in economic governance at both EU and national levels.
The ETUC supports public investment, a green economy, fair taxation and quality jobs for all. It opposes precarious work and austerity policies.

Stronger unions

The ETUC regards collective bargaining and social dialogue, and workplace and industrial democracy as key to innovation, productivity and growth in Europe. It therefore promotes capacity building for trade unions across Europe.
The social dialogue between the ETUC and European employers supplements the national social dialogues in the Member States. The ETUC supports European Works Councils, and workers' consultation and participation in decision-making.
EU cross-industry social dialogue was formally launched in 1985, with the support of former Commission President Jacques Delors. It has evolved through three stages:
I – (1985–1991) Bipartite activities culminated in the adoption of resolutions, declarations and common opinions, which did not have a binding effect.
II – (1992–1999) An accord between the social partners, signed on 31 October 1991 and subsequently annexed to the 1992 Maastricht Treaty in the form of a Social Protocol, enabled European social partner agreements to have legal force through a Council decision. In 1997, the agreement was written into the Treaty of Amsterdam (Articles 154 and 155 TFEU).
European social dialogue led to the implementation of three framework agreements (parental leave in 1995 – revised in 2009, part-time work in 1997, and fixed-term contracts in 1999) via EU Directives.
III – (1999–2005) In December 2001, the European social partners presented a "common contribution" to the Laeken European Council. In accordance with the 1991 agreement (Art. 155 par 2 TFEU), this moved towards greater independence and autonomy of the social dialogue.
Since 2002, the social partners have concluded autonomous agreements on:
 Telework (2002)
 Work-related stress (2004)
 Harassment and violence at work (2007)
 Inclusive labour markets (2010)
 A framework of actions for the lifelong development of competencies and qualifications (2002), a framework of actions on gender equality (2005), and a framework of actions on youth employment (2013).
These are implemented by the social partners themselves at national, regional and enterprise levels. The social partners' new Multiannual Work Programme runs until 2017 and foresees an accord on active ageing.
In the field of collective bargaining and wage policy, the ETUC has coordinated affiliates' activities since 1999. In 2012, the ETUC also started to coordinate trade union participation in EU economic governance and the Semester process. Every year the ETUC updates its priorities and initiatives on industrial relations and wage developments, with a view to improving working and living conditions across Europe, achieving better wages for all workers, ensuring equal treatment, combating inequalities, supporting capacity building for sound industrial relations and promote collective bargaining in all EU countries.
The ETUC favours a holistic approach to workers' involvement, including stronger information and consultation rights, board-level participation in European company forms, and support for European Works Councils. The ETUC presses for information and consultation for workers, in particular, to anticipate change or company restructuring (to cut job losses), and throughout the subcontracting chain.

Ambitious social standards

The ETUC is committed to pursuing social progress across the EU – an objective enshrined in the EU Treaty. It, therefore, calls for high-quality public services and social protection, gender equality, worker mobility, and high health and safety standards, with an end to social dumping and discrimination.
The ETUC defends the European social model as a key factor in promoting not only social justice and cohesion but also economic growth, productivity and competitiveness in the EU.
When necessary, the ETUC pursues its vision of Social Europe through direct action, such as Euro-demonstrations and campaigns, and works with civil society partners to achieve social justice and progress for workers and their families across Europe.
The ETUC is recognised by the European Union, by the Council of Europe and by the European Free Trade Association as the only representative cross-sectoral trade union organisation at the European level.

Future challenges

At its Congress in Paris, the ETUC launched a broad discussion on the role and future of trade unionism in Europe, in the face of globalisation and austerity policies affecting society in Europe and the rest of the world.
The discussion has been widened to address the future of the EU, facing challenges like the refugee emergency, Brexit, rising populism and xenophobia, and widespread discontent among citizens and workers about their economic and social conditions.
The ETUC is launching campaigns and actions, including on a fairer, sustainable economic model, quality job creation, just transition and fair trade, higher pay and wage convergence for European workers, better protection for disadvantaged, precarious and self-employed workers, and more democracy at work, in the economy and in EU institutions.

Affiliates

General Secretaries and Presidents

See also

 Confederation of European Business
 EU labour law
 French labour law
 German labour law
 UK labour law
 Unió Sindical d'Andorra

References

External links

 
 European Social Model
 European Social Partners
 European Petition for high-quality public services, accessible to all
  Solidarity in the Economic Crisis. Challenges and Expectations for European Trade Unions (Publication by the Friedrich-Ebert-Stiftung for the ETUC Congress in Athens 2011)
 Christophe Degryse (with Pierre Tilly), 1973–2013 : 40 years of history of the European Trade Union Confederation, European Trade Union Institute, 2013, 

 
Labor relations
Trade unions established in 1973
1973 establishments in Europe